Eusphecia is a genus of moths in the family Sesiidae.

Species
Eusphecia melanocephala (Dalman, 1816)
Eusphecia pimplaeformis (Oberthür, 1872)

References

Sesiidae
Taxa named by Ferdinand Le Cerf
Moth genera